Artsvakar (formerly, Ghshlakh), is former village and currently a neighbourhood within the town of Gavar, the capital of Gegharkunik Province of Armenia. It is home to an Iron Age fortress, dating back to the 2nd millennium BC.

See also 
Gegharkunik Province

References 

Populated places in Gegharkunik Province